Otto Schumann (11 September 1886 – 1952) was a German SS and police general during the Nazi era. He was born in Metz, Lorraine, on 11 September 1886. During the First World War, he served in the German Army as an officer. After the war, he became a police officer. Otto Schumann joined the NSDAP in 1933 and the SS in 1939.

During World War II, Schumann served in the SS troops in Stettin (Wehrkreis II) and The Hague in the Netherlands. From December 1942 to September 1943, he served in Münster (Wehrkreis VI). In August 1943, Otto Schumann was promoted to the rank of SS-Gruppenführer. In February 1944, Schumann was sent to Vienna, where he stayed until October 1944. Then, he took command of the SS-Oberabschnitt West, in Düsseldorf. Schumann died in Detmold, North Rhine-Westphalia, in 1952.

References

Bibliography

Further reading
 Ruth Bettina Birn: Die Höheren SS- und Polizeiführer. Himmlers Vertreter im Reich und in den besetzten Gebieten. Droste Verlag, Düsseldorf, 1986; Alfons Kenkmann, Christoph Spieker: Im Auftrag, Polizei, Verwaltung und Verantwortung, Katalog zur gleichnamigen Dauerausstellung im Geschichtsort Villa ten Hompel. Essen 2001, S.176-187; Jos Smeets: De Geschiedenis van de Nederlands Politie. Verdeeldheid en eenheid in het Rijkspolitieaparaat, Utrecht 2007.

1886 births
1952 deaths
People from Alsace-Lorraine
Military personnel from Metz
SS and Police Leaders
Netherlands in World War II
Waffen-SS personnel
SS-Gruppenführer
20th-century Freikorps personnel